is a fictional character who appears in various versions of Hyrule Warriors, a non-canonical spin-off title in Nintendo's The Legend of Zelda series, starting with the 2016 Nintendo 3DS release of Hyrule Warriors Legends.

Concept and creation
Concept artwork of Linkle wielding a red and silver crossbow was first seen in the official art book for Hyrule Warriors, with a note that a female Link was considered for the game. A later tweet from Hyrule Warriors developer Koei Tecmo's Twitter account pondered as to whether they should include her, following the attention she received. A trailer for the Nintendo 3DS re-release Hyrule Warriors Legends showed a red-and-silver crossbow, prompting people to speculate that she would be added in this version. Linkle was officially revealed for Legends in November 2015, complete with attire similar to The Legend of Zelda series protagonist Link.

While Linkle does not have any relation to Link, she was originally meant to be his sister. This was proposed by Hyrule Warriors designers at Koei Tecmo, but The Legend of Zelda franchise designer Eiji Aonuma felt that this conflicted with Link's sister Aryll in The Legend of Zelda: The Wind Waker, who was the only sister he had in the series. Linkle was designed in part to add greater diversity to the game. When asked if she would appear in future games, Aonuma remarked that they would keep her in mind.

Characteristics 
Koei Tecmo producer Yosuke Hayashi summarised Linkle's background, saying that she lives in a small village in Hyrule and cares for Cuccos. She has aspired to be a hero since she was little, and believes that the compass she received from her grandmother, which has been passed down for generations, is the symbol that proves it. He described her personality as, "boundlessly cheerful", kind and naive, and stated that "she always stops to help those in need".

Appearances
Linkle appears as a playable character in the 2016 video game Hyrule Warriors Legends, an expanded port of the original Hyrule Warriors.

Reception
Upon her reveal, Linkle received an "overwhelmingly positive" response from fans. American fans viewed Linkle as positive representation of women, influenced by what professor Kathryn Hemmann viewed as an openly hostile industry to women, while Japanese fans were not as concerned due to a more open work environment for women. Critics were mixed on Linkle, however. Women in the World staff felt that some fans may not be receptive but that she was a "victory" for female fans of role-playing games. Jonathan Holmes of Destructoid noted that reception for her was mixed across different groups, and speculated that the success of Hyrule Warriors led her to be added in Legends, as well as speculating that Linkle was a test towards appealing to women more.

Maddy Myers of The Mary Sue noted that while she "loves Linkle", she feels that she is not enough, criticizing the fact that she was not herself Link and feeling that Linkle seemed like a "one-off" and "novelty" of Nintendo's made to sell more copies of Hyrule Warriors Legends. Thomas Whitehead of Nintendo Life found her to be a "clumsy introduction to a female Link", but felt that she would open the door for better attempts in the future. Brian Ashcraft of Kotaku enjoyed her depiction, and appreciated that she did not boil down to just being a female Link. He expressed hope that she would appear in canon The Legend of Zelda games. Justin Towell of GamesRadar+ found her likable due to her "headstrong, totally oblivious-to-the-danger" style. Brendan Graeber of IGN suggested her as a possibility for Super Smash Bros. Ultimate downloadable content due to her crossbows and his infatuation for Linkle.

Notes

References

Female characters in video games
Nintendo protagonists
The Legend of Zelda characters
Fictional archers
Child superheroes
Woman soldier and warrior characters in video games
Teenage characters in video games
Video game characters introduced in 2016